Marshall Don Hunter Sr. Airport  is a state-owned public-use airport located two nautical miles (3.7 km) southeast of the central business district of Marshall, a city in the Kusilvak Census Area of the U.S. state of Alaska.

Although most U.S. airports use the same three-letter location identifier for the FAA and IATA, Marshall Don Hunter Sr. Airport is assigned MDM by the FAA and MLL by the IATA (which assigned MDM to Munduku, Papua New Guinea).

Facilities 

Airlines and destinations

Prior to its bankruptcy and cessation of all operations, Ravn Alaska served the airport from multiple locations.

References

External links 
 FAA Alaska airport diagram (GIF)
 
 Resources for this airport:
 
 
 

Airports in the Kusilvak Census Area, Alaska